The Fibres Research Centre was a research centre of ICI in Harrogate in North Yorkshire. The site today is a redeveloped business park.

History
ICI Fibres was formed on 1 April 1956, and all textile research for ICI moved to Harrogate.

Structure
It was sited in the south-west of North Yorkshire.

See also
 Winnington Laboratory

References

External links
 Harrogate: Boardroom of the North

Chemical industry in the United Kingdom
Chemical research institutes
History of the textile industry in the United Kingdom
Imperial Chemical Industries
Organisations based in Harrogate
Research institutes in North Yorkshire